Richard Schmitz (14 December 1885 in Mohelnice, Moravia – 27 April 1954 in Vienna) was the last Social-Christian mayor of Vienna, Austria.

Schmitz served as Vice Chancellor of Austria, as well as its Minister of Social Welfare and of Education, and as Commissioner of Vienna. He was a member of the pro-Habsburg Christian Social Party.

After an active role in the Heimwehr-Austrofascist clash with the Clericals, Chancellor Engelbert Dollfuss appointed him Mayor of Vienna in 1934. He succeeded elected Mayor Karl Seitz. Ardently anti-Nazi, Schmitz was Mayor four years later when Austria was absorbed into the Third Reich in the Anschluss. Until that point, Schmitz spoke out publicly against Nazism and its tactics.

Along with thousands of other prominent Austrians, Richard Schmitz was arrested and taken to Dachau concentration camp in Bavaria where he remained for the length of the war. In late April 1945 Schmitz was, together with other prominent concentration camp inmates, transferred to Tyrol where the SS left the prisoners behind. He was liberated by American troops on 5 May 1945.

See also 
 Schmitz

1885 births
1954 deaths
People from Mohelnice
Vice-Chancellors of Austria
Mayors of Vienna
Dachau concentration camp survivors
Austrian people of Moravian-German descent
Christian Social Party (Austria) politicians